Timaeus the Sophist was a Greek philosopher who lived sometime between the 1st and 4th centuries. Nothing is known about his life. He is the supposed author of a Lexicon of Platonic words which is still extant. The Lexicon made use of earlier commentaries on Plato which are now lost. It underwent significant additions and subtractions of text during later periods leading to the inclusion of many words which have nothing to do with Plato or his philosophy. The purpose of the Lexicon was to explain the usage of words and phrases which occur in Plato's works. The first detailed study of the manuscript and edition of the Lexicon was produced in the late 18th century by David Ruhnken (1754; 2nd ed. 1789) who also provided a detailed commentary. There was a revised version of Ruhnken's second edition by Georg Aenotheus Koch in 1828.

References
Eleanor Dickey, (2007), Ancient Greek Scholarship, page 47. Oxford University Press
Michael C. Carhart, (2007), The Science of Culture in Enlightenment Germany, pages 121-4. Harvard University Press

Middle Platonists
Roman-era Sophists